Thomas Howard, 3rd Viscount Howard of Bindon (died 1611) was an English peer and politician. He was a Knight of the Garter, Lord Lieutenant of Dorset 25 April 1601 – 1 March 1611, Custos Rotulorum of Dorset before 1605–1611, and Vice-Admiral of Dorset 1603–1611. He was the son of Thomas Howard, 1st Viscount Howard of Bindon, youngest son of Thomas Howard, 3rd Duke of Norfolk. He succeeded to the viscountcy in 1590, upon the childless death of his elder brother, Henry. The title became extinct when he died in 1611 without male children.

Viscount Bindon built Lulworth Castle. In 1607 he described the building as a conception of his own mind, and wrote to Robert Cecil, 1st Earl of Salisbury crediting his part in origins of the design;"If this little pile in Lulworth Park shall prove pretty or worth the labour bestowed in the erecting of it, I will acknowledge, as the truth is, that your powerful speech to me at Bindon laid the first foundation of the pile in my mind, which ever since has laboured for a speedy finishing for the contentment of those for whose further liking of that place the care is taken".

References

Thomas Howard, 3rd Viscount Howard of Bindon
1611 deaths
Knights of the Garter
16th-century births
Year of birth missing
16th-century English nobility
17th-century English nobility
Lord-Lieutenants of Dorset
Viscounts Howard of Bindon